Wild Orchid was an American girl group consisting of Stacy Ferguson, Stefanie Ridel, and Renee Sandstrom. Beginning under the name "NRG" in 1990, the group changed their name to Wild Orchid in 1992 and signed with RCA Records in 1994. The group released two albums, earning Billboard Music Awards nominations with their debut. In 2001, Ferguson left the group. Sandstrom and Ridel continued as a duo, releasing Wild Orchid's final album Hypnotic in 2003. In 2013, Us Weekly named the group number 18 of the 25 'Best Girl Groups of All Time'.

History

1990-96: Formation and "At Night I Pray" 
Wild Orchid began in 1990 when former Kids Incorporated cast members Renee Sandstrom and Stacy Ferguson and their friend Stefanie Ridel decided to form an all-girl group based on their shared love of music and poetry, and they originally called themselves New Rhythm Generation, or NRG. Heather Holyoak soon joined the group and they began searching for a record contract. As they wrote their songs and recorded their first single, entitled "Get Crazy – Work It," the girls also began coming up with choreographies for their music.

In February 1991, NRG gave their first performance in a Los Angeles nightclub. Heather Holyoak returned to college, and was replaced by Micki Duran. In July 1991, NRG performed to a sold-out crowd at a BMI showcase. Their former manager claimed that he owned the rights to the group's name. By 1992, the group changed their name to Wild Orchid and hired Marta Marrero, mother of fellow Kids Incorporated alumna Martika, as their new manager.

Wild Orchid joined forces with several record labels including RCA, EMI, and Capitol, eventually signing with Sony Publishing and RCA Records in 1994. Ron Fair became the group’s A&R rep, eventually co-producing their first album. Duran left the group to work on the Nickelodeon TV show Roundhouse, leaving Wild Orchid as a trio. In 1995, Wild Orchid recorded the theme song for the NBC sitcom Hope & Gloria.

The group's first single "At Night I Pray" charted at number 63 on the Billboard Hot 100 and on the R&B Singles charts at number 49 in November 1996. A music video directed by Marcus Nispel, known for his work with Janet Jackson, was in heavy rotation on MTV, BET and VH1.

1997-98: Wild Orchid 
In March 1997, Wild Orchid released their self-titled debut album Wild Orchid. The largely self-written album sold nearly a million units worldwide (including 108,000 units in the U.S. according to SoundScan) and included the singles "Talk to Me", "At Night I Pray" and "Supernatural". "Talk to Me" received two Billboard Music Award nominations in the categories of Best clip and Best new artist clip.

Wild Orchid spent most of 1997 promoting their debut album, making appearances on various TV shows such as Oddville, MTV, The RuPaul Show, Vibe, Mad TV, Soul Train, and The Jenny Jones Show, in addition to a guest appearance on the UPN sitcom Goode Behavior. The group were frequent guest hosts on E!'s The Gossip Show. The trio toured as an opening act for 98 Degrees and 'N Sync across the U.S. 

In May 1998, they released dance remixes of their songs "I Won't Play the Fool" and "Follow Me" (from their debut album) which were underground club hits.  The "I Won't Play the Fool" remix landed on a Top 10 Dance Remixes Chart of 1998 in Billboard. That same month, they performed at "Divas Simply Singing", an annual AIDS benefit concert in Los Angeles hosted by Sheryl Lee Ralph.

In 1998, Wild Orchid were featured on the song "I Will Show You Mine” on the album Home Again from Dutch singer Rene Froger.

1998-99: Oxygen and tours 
In September 1998, they released their second album, Oxygen, which included the first and only single "Be Mine". The album sold 22,000 copies in the U.S. according to Billboard. The album release coincided with the group's stint as Guess spokespersons and models. They embarked on a brief promotional tour throughout the U.S., continued to host on E!'s The Gossip Show, and performed "Be Mine" on Donny and Marie. Ferguson later recounted that during this tour, which was during the group's waning popularity, they performed at a county fair next to a barn of pigs for an audience of only three people. Ferguson woefully explained how "the pigs cared more (about us) than the people".

That month, Wild Orchid debuted as hosts of the Fox Family Channel's Saturday morning show Great Pretenders, which featured chart hits lip-synched by young kids, while competing for prizes. This show lasted four seasons, from 1998 to 2001.

In February 1999, the group performed "Declaration" and "Come As You Are" at the fictional Peach Pit After Dark during the ninth season of the FOX primetime soap drama Beverly Hills, 90210 (episode titled "Beheading St. Valentine").

In summer 1999, they opened for Cher's "Do You Believe? Tour" alongside Cyndi Lauper, which toured at 52 cities across the U.S. and Canada. For a period in 1999, there were rumors of the group re-recording songs for a re-release of their Oxygen album, due to poor sales of the original version. A remixed version of their ballad "Come As You Are" was leaked onto the Internet, but a reworked Oxygen was never officially released.

In November 1999, the group appeared in the Macy's Annual Thanksgiving Parade where they sang a two-minute clip of their song "25 Days Of Christmas".

1999-2001: Fire and Ferguson's departure 
Between 1999 and 2000, the group worked on their third album Fire, which included several tracks co-written and produced by JC Chasez of *NSYNC.  The album was slated for an August 2000 release according to Billboard, however the release date was eventually pushed back to June 2001. The track "It's All Your Fault", which was slated to be on Fire, was featured in the 2000 film What Women Want, but was not included on the film soundtrack.

In May 2001, the group released the first single from their album Fire, called "Stuttering (Don't Say)", which reached #33 on the Billboard Top 40 Singles Sales chart, and had a concert special on MuchUSA called Shoutback on July 29, 2001. They also became models for Bongo Jeans. The group co-wrote the song "What's Good 4 the Goose", which appeared on pop group Eden's Crush debut album Popstars (2001). Wild Orchid went on a U.S. promotional tour for Fire between May and July 2001, where they performed mainly in clubs and small venues with other teen-pop acts.

The newer release date for Fire was shifted to June 5, 2001, then eventually June 19; however their record label RCA ultimately declined to release it. This event marked the beginning of the end of Wild Orchid as a trio. On July 19, 2001, the group performed their last concert together at Sea World in San Diego. On July 24, 2001, they filmed their final episode of Great Pretenders, and the show was cancelled ten days later upon the announcement that Fox Family Channel was merging with Disney-owned ABC.

In September 2001, the group was dropped from RCA, and Ferguson left Wild Orchid.

Between 2002 and 2003, Wild Orchid returned as a duo with Sandstrom and Ridel. Their album Hypnotic was released on the group's website in January 2003, and reportedly sold 5000 copies online. On September 26, 2006, Talk To Me: Hits, Rarities & Gems was released by Sony BMG Special Products. It is fundamentally a greatest-hits package, featuring previously released songs from Wild Orchid and Oxygen in addition to the only released single from Fire, "Stuttering (Don't Say)" and its B-side, "Lies".

Solo efforts 
On May 28, 2001, Minneapolis-based radio station KDWB hosted a concert which featured both Wild Orchid and hip-hop group the Black Eyed Peas. It was during this event that Stacy Ferguson met will.i.am, spoke to him about producing her solo album, and exchanged phone numbers with him. In 2002, she joined the Black Eyed Peas under the stage name 'Fergie.'

Renee Sandstrom is now primarily a session singer for children's music. In 2004, she provided the singing voice for 'Princess Fiona' in the Shrek 2 special feature Far Far Away Idol. Her vocals have been featured on several Disney albums, including Mousercise (2007), Disney Cuties (2008), the Camp Rock soundtrack (2008), and Playhouse Disney Let's Dance (2010). In 2007, she sang with Ruben Martinez in "Just Like We Dreamed It", which was the theme song for the 15th anniversary of Disneyland Resort Paris. The song was released as a single exclusively in France on March 31, 2007. Sandstrom wrote the music for the song "On Penguin Pond", featured on the Volume One soundtrack for Jim Henson Company's Sid the Science Kid (2009).

Stefanie Ridel co-founded the Talent Bootcamp, in which she teaches young aspiring musical artists. Between 2004 and 2005, Ridel was the lead singer for the techno-dance duo '5th Element' with DJ Rain, and their album was released exclusively online on DJ Rain's website. Ridel's singing voice was heard on the Bratz: The Movie soundtrack (2007), in which she sang the lead on two songs and co-wrote and co-produced many others. Ridel is married to former Wild Orchid producer and Geffen Records president Ron Fair. They have four children together.

Discography

Studio albums
Wild Orchid (1997)
Oxygen (1998) 
Fire (2001)
Hypnotic (2003)

Compilation albums
Talk to Me: Hits, Rarities & Gems (2006)

Singles

Music videos

Awards and nominations

References

External links
 Stefanie Ridel Website
 Wild Orchid Biography at Yahoo Music
 Wild Orchid at iTunes

1991 establishments in California
American dance music groups
American pop girl groups
American girl groups
American pop music groups
American contemporary R&B musical groups
Fergie (singer)
Musical groups established in 1990
Musical groups disestablished in 2003
American musical trios